Nicosia New General Hospital is the Nicosia district's main medical center. It opened in 2006, replacing Nicosia Old General Hospital.

The contract for the construction of the New Nicosia General Hospital was signed in 1997. On 14 April 1997, the former President of the Republic of Cyprus, Glafkos Clerides, laid the foundation stone.

The cost for the construction and equipment of the New Nicosia General Hospital was about 120 million Cyprus pounds (205 million euro). On 17 October 2006, the removal from the Old to the New Nicosia General Hospital was completed.

The New Nicosia General Hospital was inaugurated by the former President of the Republic of Cyprus, Tassos Papadopoulos, on 30 March 2007.

The hospital occupies an area of 102000 m2, of which approximately 31000m2 are non-hospital premises.

Notes

Hospital buildings completed in 2006
Hospitals in Cyprus
Buildings and structures in Nicosia
Hospitals established in 2006